V. Subramanya Pillai was an Indian lawyer and administrator who served as the Diwan of the Cochin kingdom from 1893 to 1897.

As Diwan 

Subramanya Pillai is credited with introducing the Indian Stamp Law in the Cochin kingdom. He also reformed the Jail and Salt departments, opened sanitary boards and reorganized the Medical Department.

References 
 

Diwans of Cochin